Perth Amboy is a station on NJ Transit's North Jersey Coast Line, located in Perth Amboy, New Jersey. The station is located in a cut between Elm Street and Maple Street and between Smith Street and Market Street in downtown Perth Amboy, and has two low side platforms.

History 
The station building was built in 1928 to replace an older structure built by the Central Railroad of New Jersey that was moved to Lewis Street and currently serves as a private residence there. It been listed in the state and federal registers of historic places since 1984 and is part of the Operating Passenger Railroad Stations Thematic Resource.

Station renovations 
The station was refurbished in the 1990s. On June 16, 2010, New Jersey Transit (NJT) announced it had agreed to a $1 million (2010 USD) contract for a consultant to study the addition of high-level platforms to make the station compliant with the Americans with Disabilities Act of 1990 (ADA). NJ Transit's 2015 budget allocated $9.6 million for the final design for a major renovation that would make the station compliant with the ADA by adding elevators, and also include canopies and upgrades to communication systems. Ground was broken on the $45 million (2022 USD) project on April 21, 2022, with Governor Phil Murphy in attendance.

Station layout
Perth Amboy has two tracks and two low-level asphalt side platforms. The platforms are located below street level in a cut. At street level, there is a ticket office.

See also
List of New Jersey Transit stations
National Register of Historic Places listings in Middlesex County, New Jersey
Perth Amboy Ferry Slip

Bibliography

References

External links

NJT North Jersey Coast Line (World-NYC-Subway.org)
Perth Amboy New Jersey Transit station (The Subway Nut)
 Smith Street entrance from Google Maps Street View
 Station House from Google Maps Street View

Perth Amboy, New Jersey
NJ Transit Rail Operations stations
Railway stations in Middlesex County, New Jersey
Railway stations on the National Register of Historic Places in New Jersey
Former Central Railroad of New Jersey stations
National Register of Historic Places in Middlesex County, New Jersey
New Jersey Register of Historic Places
Railway stations in the United States opened in 1875
Former Pennsylvania Railroad stations
Former New York and Long Branch Railroad stations
1875 establishments in New Jersey